Andrej Martin and Hans Podlipnik were the defending champions but only Podlipnik chose to defend his title, partnering Marcel Felder. Podlipnik lost in the quarterfinals to Andrés Molteni and Diego Schwartzman.

Molteni and Schwartzman won the title after Fabiano de Paula and Christian Garin withdrew before the final.

Seeds

Draw

References
 Main Draw

Uruguay Open - Doubles